Bibiana Candelas Ramírez (born December 2, 1983 in Torreon, Coahuila) is a 6'5" (195 cm) female beach volleyball and indoor volleyball player who represented her native country, Mexico, at the 2008 Olympics with her beach partner, Mayra García.

Prep and early life
Candelas was born in Torreón, Coahuila.

She graduated in 2002 from Colegio Ponceño in Puerto Rico, but attended Preparatoria Luzac in Torreón as a freshman and sophomore. She was an eight-year (1997–2004) member of the Mexico women's national volleyball team.

USC
She played middle blocker at the University of Southern California from 2002 to 2005 and was a three time All-American. She helped her team win the 2002 and 2003 NCAA Women's Volleyball Championship, as well as a final four appearance in 2004.

National team
Candelas played in the 2002 Pan-American Cup helping her team to reach the 4th place and individually winning the Best Blocker award.
 2002: 21st place in the World Championship in Germany
 2002: Bronze Medal in the Central American and Caribbean Games in El Salvador
 2006: 21st place in the World Championship in Japan

Pan American Games 
Candelas won the silver medal in 2011 Pan American Games.

Clubs
  Leonas de Ponce (2002)

Awards

Individuals
 2002 Pan-American Cup "Best Blocker"

References

External links
 FIVB Biography
 
 
 USC Bio
 NORCECA Beach Volleyball Circuit 2008
 
 

1983 births
Living people
Mexican women's volleyball players
American women's volleyball players
Mexican beach volleyball players
Women's beach volleyball players
Olympic beach volleyball players of Mexico
Beach volleyball players at the 2007 Pan American Games
Beach volleyball players at the 2008 Summer Olympics
Beach volleyball players at the 2011 Pan American Games
Beach volleyball players at the 2015 Pan American Games
Expatriate volleyball players in the United States
USC Trojans women's volleyball players
Sportspeople from Torreón
Pan American Games silver medalists for Mexico
Pan American Games bronze medalists for Mexico
Pan American Games medalists in volleyball
Central American and Caribbean Games bronze medalists for Mexico
Competitors at the 2002 Central American and Caribbean Games
Middle blockers
Central American and Caribbean Games medalists in volleyball
Medalists at the 2011 Pan American Games